Frontiers of '49 is a 1939 American Western film directed by Joseph Levering and starring Wild Bill Elliott, Luana Alcañiz and Charles King.

Cast
 Wild Bill Elliott as Major John Freeman
 Luana Alcañiz as Dolores de Cervantes
 Charles King as Howard Brunton
 Hal Taliaferro as Kit
 Slim Whitaker as Deputy Sheriff Brad
 Octavio Giraud as Don Miguel Cervantes
 Carlos Villarías as Padre
 Joe De La Cruz as Ramon Romero 
 Jack Walters as Pete Martin - Auctioneer
 Al Ferguson as Red - Henchman
 Buzz Barton as Auctioneer's Assistant
 Kit Guard as Bert - Brunton's Clerk
 Jack Ingram as Captain Beatty 
 Bud Osborne as Judge Scott
 Lee Shumway as Bidding Rancher

References

Bibliography
 Blottner, Gene. Wild Bill Elliott: A Complete Filmography. McFarland, 2011.

External links
 

1939 films
1939 Western (genre) films
American Western (genre) films
Films directed by Joseph Levering
American black-and-white films
Columbia Pictures films
1930s English-language films
1930s American films